Harry Patrick O'Neill (February 10, 1889 – June 24, 1953) was a Democratic United States Representative from Pennsylvania.

Biography
Harry P. O'Neill was born in Dunmore, Pennsylvania to Irish immigrants.  He left school at the age of ten and went to work as a slate picker in the O.S. Johnson Colliery in Dunmore.  He worked evenings as an apprentice barber until the age of sixteen and at the age of eighteen purchased his employer's business.  He was also engaged as an insurance broker.  He served in the Pennsylvania State House of Representatives from 1929 to 1948.

O'Neill was elected as a Democrat to the Eighty-first and Eighty-second Congresses, but he was an unsuccessful candidate for reelection in 1952, when redistricting forced him into an election with fellow incumbent Congressman Joseph L. Carrigg.

References

1889 births
1953 deaths
Democratic Party members of the Pennsylvania House of Representatives
American people of Irish descent
Democratic Party members of the United States House of Representatives from Pennsylvania
People from Dunmore, Pennsylvania
Barbers
Insurance agents
20th-century American politicians